Kot pri Veliki Slevici is a small settlement south of Velika Slevica in the Municipality of Velike Lašče in central Slovenia. The area is part of the traditional region of Lower Carniola and is now included in the Central Slovenia Statistical Region.

Name
Kot pri Veliki Slevici was attested in historical sources as Winkel in 1505. The name of the settlement was changed from Kot to Kot pri Veliki Slevici in 1953.

References

External links

Kot pri Veliki Slevici on Geopedia

Populated places in the Municipality of Velike Lašče